WNYX-LD, virtual channel 32 (VHF digital channel 5), is a low-power television station licensed to New York City. The station is owned by the New York Spectrum Holdings Company and operated by CMMB America. There is one subchannel on the multiplex, Diya TV.

History

As W59AT and W44AI
Originally, this station began operations on channel 59 as W59AT, licensed to Plainview, becoming the third TV station in Long Island and the second independent station since WSNL (channel 67) first went on the air 7 years earlier. In the early years the station was the first in broadcasting an all-music video format from Satellite Program Network as secondary from 5 a.m. to 2 a.m. In addition to music videos the station also aired instructional programming from local colleges and ethnic and community programming. For a time, it was a translator for WLIG (channel 55; now WLNY-TV). In 1987, it moved to channel 44 and changed its city of license to Hicksville, accordingly changing its call letters to W44AI. During this time, it operated with an eclectic mix of public access-type programs and shows from independent producers, which included the only regularly scheduled show for the region's LGBTQ+ community. In 1994, it changed its call letters to WNYX-LP (having already used WNYX as its name), and in 1997 it moved to channel 35 in New York, NY.

As WNYX-LP
Throughout the 1990s and 2000s, WNYX-LP aired community programming, some of which was produced by local businesses and public-access television studios. Like its sister station WNXY-LD, this station broadcasts community public-access television-type programming. Other programming that was produced in the early 1990s were psychic tarot readings. In 2004, WNYX produced an hour-long program called The New Yorkers, hosted by James Chladek. Another program that was added was a movie review program hosted by Stu Lee. Other programming included flavor music videos which were added back after 7 years.

In 2005, WNYX began to air Almavision from 9am to 9pm, with community programing airing weeknights and weekends. In 2006, Nuestra TV was carried full-time. A year later, WNYX went back to its current independent status. Metro Studios moved from East 23rd Street to its new location on West 42nd Street in Times Square in 2007. As a result, WNYX ceased operations temporarily from June to late November of that year.

WNYX returned to the air two days before Thanksgiving, with a new branding of TV 35 New York. Some of its programming was replaced by The New Yorkers, which aired during the day. During the evenings, old classic movies aired along with psychic readings. On weekends, only religious programming aired in the mornings. In 2009, around the same time Pulse 87 audio programming was being aired over co-owned WNYZ-LP, the entire programming lineup was dropped in favor of another format called The Jared Whitham Channel featuring Jared Whitham, a bespectacled local area comic/musician. WNYX-LP temporarily signed off in October 2009, along with co-owned WNXY and WXNY, in order to build out digital transmitting facilities. WNYX is currently licensed to New York, but it is available online which has since been shut down.

As WNYX-LD
WNYX returned to the air in November 2010 with a new format airing both paid programming and religious programming under a temporary LMA with Jacobs Broadcasting. Soon after, the station rebranded itself simply as WNYX. WNYX is still owned by Island Broadcasting Company. However, due to an investigation on fraud charges which the founder has since found guilty in 2013, it was removed and has since replaced by SMPTE Color Bars once again. WNYX-LD simulcasts the programming on co-owned WNXY-LD and WXNY-LD. Programming consists of silent black & white movies featuring Charlie Chaplin and Buster Keaton. Island Broadcasting sold the following stations to NY Spectrum Holdings in 2012. Early that year in 2012, WNYX became a full-time CCTV news affiliate. As of September 2013, WNYX-LD is off the air, with the CCTV co-affiliation going to sister station WNXY Channel 43. There is no word yet on if WNYX-LD will return to the airwaves with another format. In 2016, WNYX returned on the air simulcasting CCTV News branding 32.1. The following year CCTV News was renamed to CGTN America though it continues with the all-news format. WNYX appeared in September 2018 on channel 35.513 blank it is not known what format they will be airing though it is no longer available and has since applied its construction permit to move to channel 5 a frequency previously used by WNYW. It is currently not on the air. In mid 2021 after 8 years as a news affiliate of CGTN America the station switch to its new affiliate Diya TV an US based network simulcasting WNXY-LD. This new transition marks the first time since WDVB-CD adds this South Asian format in early 2010. As well as simulcasting, only this time it is WNXY-LD that will be carrying this network alongside WNYX. An ironic twist from nearly 15 years ago when WNXY simulcast WNYX as an independent station.

Subchannels
The station's digital signal was multiplexed:

References

External links
 
 #1
 #2
 #3
 

Retro TV affiliates
Low-power television stations in the United States
Television channels and stations established in 1980
NYX-LD
Diya TV affiliates